Abu Muhammad Khalaf ibn Hisham ibn Tha'lab al-Asadi al-Bazzar al-Baghdadi, better known as Khalaf (150–229AH,  -844CE), was an important figure in the history of the Qur'an and the Qira'at, or method of recitation. In addition to being a transmitter for the Quran reading method of Hamzah az-Zaiyyat, one of the seven canonical readers, he was also known for his own independent method that is counted among the three accepted but less famous methods.

For Khalaf's own, independent method of recitation, the two primary transmitters from him were Ishaq al-Maruzi and Idris al-Had dad.

He died in the year 844CE.

References

844 deaths
Quranic readings